Štefan Moyses (also as Štefan Moyzes, ; October 24, 1797 in Veselé (then Veszele) – July 5, 1869 in Žiar nad Hronom (then Garamszentkereszt)) was a Slovak prelate who served as the 6th Bishop of Banská Bystrica, teacher, patriot, co-founder and first Chairman of Matica slovenská.

Biography 
Štefan Moyses was ordained a priest in 1821. He served as chaplain in several parishes of the archdiocese of Esztergom, later worked in Croatia. In January 1830 he became professor of Zagreb Academy. In 1847 he was appointed a canon of Zagreb chapter and was elected member of Diet of the Kingdom of Hungary. He was supporter of Ľudovít Štúr proposals put forward by the Diet of the Kingdom of Hungary in 1848, the re-introduction of mother tongue in primary education and in worship. In 1850 he was appointed the 6th Bishop of Banská Bystrica. He was the head of the Slovak delegation that arrived at the imperial court of Emperor Franz Joseph I on  12 December 1861 to submit Memorandum národa slovenského (Memorandum of the Slovak nation) and Prosbopis Slovákov to the Emperor. On 3 August 1863 he became the first Chairman of Matica slovenská. He was granted the permission from Holy See to celebrate 5 July as the Feast day of Sts. Cyril and Methodius.

Slovak Roman Catholic bishops
1797 births
1869 deaths
People from Piešťany District
Slovak academics
19th-century Roman Catholic bishops in Hungary